Nitzana may refer to:

Nitzana (Nabataean city), a city of the ancient Nabataeans located in the Negev desert in Israel
Nitzana, Israel, a communal settlement near the ruins of the Nabataean city
Nitzana Border Crossing, a border crossing between Israel and Egypt

See also
Ashdod Nitzanim Sand Dune Park
Nitzan, a communal settlement in southern Israel located among the Nitzanim sand dunes north of Ashkelon
Nitzanei Sinai, a communal settlement also known as Kadesh Barne'a after the Exodus station of that name.